Badru Lusambya (born 28 October 1982, in Kampala) is a super welterweight Ugandan boxer who turned pro in 2002.

Professional boxing record

References

1982 births
Living people
Ugandan male boxers
Light-middleweight boxers
African Boxing Union champions
Southpaw boxers
Sportspeople from Kampala